Saint-Denis-près-Martel is a railway station in Saint-Denis-lès-Martel, Occitanie, France. The station is on the Brive–Toulouse (via Capdenac) and Souillac–Viescamp-sous-Jallès railway lines. The station is served by Intercités de nuit (night train) and TER (local) services operated by SNCF.

The station is also on the preserved railway of the Chemin de Fer Touristique du Haut Quercy (CFTHQ), which operates between Martel and Saint-Denis-lès-Martel, a distance of 7 km. They use both steam and diesel trains to operate tourist services along the line.

Train services
The following services currently call at Saint-Denis-près-Martel:
night services (Intercités de nuit) Paris–Orléans–Figeac–Rodez–Albi
local service (TER Auvergne-Rhône-Alpes) Brive-la-Gaillarde–Aurillac
local service (TER Occitanie) Brive-la-Gaillarde–Figeac–Rodez

References

External links

CFTHQ Preserved Railway Website

Railway stations in Lot (department)
Railway lines opened in 1862
1862 establishments in France